Deh-e Mohammad Shahraki (also romanized as Deh-e Moḩammad Shahrakī; also known as Moḩammad Shahrakī) is a village in Jahanabad Rural District, in the Central District of Hirmand County, Sistan and Baluchestan Province, Iran. According to the 2006 census, its population was 202, in 46 families.

References 

Populated places in Hirmand County